Joseph, Marquis de Saint Brisson (8 May 1867 – 4 May 1927) was a French fencer. He competed in the individual sabre event at the 1908 Summer Olympics.

References

External links
 

1867 births
1927 deaths
French male sabre fencers
Olympic fencers of France
Fencers at the 1908 Summer Olympics